COVID-19 vaccination in Taiwan is an ongoing immunization campaign against severe acute respiratory syndrome coronavirus 2 (SARS-CoV-2), in response to the ongoing pandemic in the country. Following the approval of the Oxford–AstraZeneca COVID-19 vaccine on 18 March 2021, vaccinations commenced on 22 March 2021, and will continue throughout the year with the goal of vaccinating 70% of the population by late October 2021.

As of 21 October 2022, 21,761,873 people, or 93.81% of the Taiwanese population has received at least one dose, while 20,447,829 people, or 88.14% of the population have received at least two doses, while 17,102,993, or 73.73% of the population have received at least three, while 3,300,926 people, or 14.23% of the population having received at least four, and 249,559 people, or 1.1% of the population, having received all five. A further 185,463 immunocompromised individuals, or 0.8% of the population, have received a weakened version of the booster dose. 93.96% of those over 12 have received the first booster dose, while 41.4% of those over 65 have received the second booster dose.



Timeline

2021

March to May 

On 3 March 2021 the first shipment of the Oxford–AstraZeneca COVID-19 vaccine was delivered. The 117,000 doses are part of the 10 million doses of the vaccine that the Taiwanese government had previously ordered.

On 18 March the AstraZeneca vaccine was approved by the government, and vaccinations commenced on 22 March 2021. The vaccine is free for all Taiwanese people and long-term residents. Health workers, other frontline workers and seniors were the first to be inoculated with the vaccine.

On 5 May the Moderna COVID-19 vaccine was approved for emergency use, and the first batch of 150,000 doses was delivered on 28 May 2021.

On 17 May 400,000 doses of the AstraZeneca vaccine that were ordered through COVAX arrived in the midst of Taiwan's largest COVID-19 pandemic.

On 31 May Taiwan Centers for Disease Control announced that 10 million doses of domestically produced vaccines (Medigen and United Biomedical) had been pre-reserved. 5 million of each vaccine were reserved. They are expected to be approved and deployed sometime in July 2021.

June 
On 2 June Taiwan recorded the first case of blood clotting linked to the Oxford–AstraZeneca COVID-19 vaccination.

On 4 June Japan donated 1.24 million doses of the Oxford–AstraZeneca COVID-19 vaccine to Taiwan.

On 6 June three American senators who arrived in Taiwan announced that the United States will donate 750,000 vaccine doses to Taiwan, the brand of which is still currently unknown. On 20 June 2.5 million Moderna vaccine doses arrived, which represented an increase from the 750,000 doses pledged. The doses arrived on a China Airlines flight from Memphis.

On 18 June Taiwan Centers for Disease Control announced that a second shipment of 240,000 doses of the Moderna vaccine were set to arrive in Taiwan from Luxembourg.

On 22 June the government of Lithuania announced that it was donating 20,000 doses of AstraZeneca vaccine in September. It was announced that earlier in the pandemic, Taiwan had sent 100,000 masks to Lithuania in a time of need.

July 
On 4 July the Taiwanese government has successfully vaccinated 10% of the population with at least one dose of COVID-19 vaccine.

On 7 July the first batch of a Thailand-made AstraZeneca vaccine arrived in Taiwan. The 625,000 doses are part of the 10 million doses that the Taiwanese government had previously ordered.

On 8 July Japan donated another 1.13 million doses of the AstraZeneca vaccine to Taiwan. Combined with the first donation, Japan has donated a total of 2.37 million doses of the vaccine to Taiwan.

On 12 July Foxconn Technology and TSMC announced that they had reached final agreements with Fosun Pharma to each purchase 5 million doses of the Pfizer-BioNTech COVID-19 vaccine. Combined, the two deals would include a total of 10 million vaccines, which will be donated to Taiwan's CDC for Taiwan's domestic vaccination plan. Despite signing the deal with Shanghai Fosun Pharmaceutical Group, an agreement has been made that the Pfizer-BioNTech COVID-19 vaccines would be manufactured and shipped directly from Germany. The deal has been widely seen as a compromise between multiple parties. The Tsai Administration, which was strictly against the importation of Chinese COVID-19 vaccines in Taiwan, has successfully secured direct access to German manufactured Pfizer-BioNTech COVID-19 vaccine. Meanwhile, Shanghai Fosun Pharmaceutical Group is able to maintain the legitimacy of their license and distribution rights in China, SAR Hong Kong, SAR Macau, and Taiwan.

On 13 July Taiwan's Central Epidemic Command Center announced that all residents and nationals of Taiwan who were born in or before 2003 would be eligible for making appointments on the Taiwanese COVID-19 vaccination platform, marking the next stage of Taiwan's domestic wide COVID-19 vaccination.

On 15 July Taiwan received three shipments of COVID-19 vaccines. The shipments of vaccine includes 970,000 doses of the Oxford-AstraZeneca vaccine donated by Japan, 560,000 doses of the vaccine manufactured in Thailand, and 350,000 doses of the Moderna vaccine made in Europe, which equals to a total of 1.88 million doses of vaccines. The Japanese donation is the third batch of the AstraZeneca vaccine that the Japanese government has donated to Taiwan. Combined with the previous two, the Japanese government has donated a total amount of 3.37 million doses.

On 16 July the Taiwanese government has successfully vaccinated 20% of the population with at least one dose of COVID-19 vaccine.

On 19 July the Taiwanese government granted Emergency Usage Authorization (EUA) to the COVID-19 vaccine developed by Medigen Biotechnology Corp. The Medigen COVID-19 vaccine is the first domestic COVID-19 vaccine that was given EUA approval by the Taiwanese government and the first in the world. Despite the vaccine has proven to be safe through its Phase 2 clinical trial, the approval was still considered a controversial political move due to the lack of efficacy data and Phase 3 clinical-trial.

On 21 July the Tzu Chi Foundation announced they had reached final agreements and signed a deal with Fosun Pharma to purchase 5 million doses of Pfizer–BioNTech COVID-19 vaccine. The 5 million doses of the Pfizer-BioNTech COVID-19 vaccine would be donated to Taiwan's CDC for Taiwan's domestic vaccination plan. Combined with the previous two deals signed by Foxconn Technology and TSMC, the three companies would acquire a total of 15 million doses of the Pfizer-BioNTech COVID-19 vaccine for the Taiwanese government.

Taiwan's government also announced on the same day that vaccination roll-out would be extended to the age group of 12 to 18, which will be prioritized to receive the Pfizer-BioNTech COVID-19 vaccine once it is delivered.

On 22 July the Taiwanese government announced a series of new orders of the Moderna COVID-19 vaccine. The deal includes the additional purchase of 1 million doses of Moderna COVID-19 vaccine for the 4th quarter of 2021 and 35 million doses of booster vaccine for 2022 and 2023.

On 27 July Taiwan received 582,000 doses of the Oxford-AstraZeneca COVID-19 vaccine. This is the fourth batch of vaccine that the Taiwanese government have received as part of their 10 million dose order of Oxford-AstraZeneca COVID-19 vaccine.

On 28 July the Taiwanese government has successfully vaccinated 30% of the population with at least one dose of COVID-19 vaccine.

On 31 July 20,000 doses of Oxford–AstraZeneca COVID-19 vaccine donated by the Lithuanian government arrived in Taiwan, making Lithuania the third country after Japan and the United States to donate COVID-19 vaccine to Taiwan.

August 
On 2 August Taiwan's Food and Drug Administration (TFDA) finished the inspection of the first 4 batches of the local made Medigen COVID-19 vaccine. The first four batches of Medigen COVID-19 vaccine includes a total of 265,568 doses, which will be use for Taiwan's domestic vaccination starting in August.

On 8 August Taiwan received 99,600 doses of the Moderna COVID-19 vaccine. This is the 5th batch of vaccine that the Taiwanese government have received part of their 6.05 million dose order of Moderna COVID-19 vaccine that are scheduled to arrive in 2021.

On 12 August Taiwan received 524,000 doses of the Oxford–AstraZeneca COVID-19 vaccine.

On 15 August Taiwan received 249,600 doses of the Moderna COVID-19 vaccine. The 249,600 doses of vaccine were scheduled to be use as the 2nd shot for those who already received the first dose startirgting in September.

On 23 August President Tsai Ing-wen received the first shot of the local made Medigen COVID-19 vaccine, kick starting the vaccination of Taiwan's first locally made COVID-19 vaccine. On the same day, Taiwan's Food and Drug Administration (TFDA) also finished the inspection of 4 additional batches of the Medigen COVID-19 vaccine. With inspections clear with the 4 additional batches of Medigen COVID-19 vaccine, a total 870,000 doses of Medigen COVID-19 vaccine are scheduled to be delivered in the following week.

In the end of August and start of September, Taiwan have received a few additional batches of COVID-19 vaccines from both direct pharmaceutical orders and donations. On 27 and 31 of August, Taiwan received 265,000 doses and 595,000 doses of the Oxford–AstraZeneca COVID-19 vaccine. On 29 August, Taiwan received 30,000 doses of Moderna COVID-19 vaccine that were donated by the Czech government. On 2 September, Taiwan received 930,000 doses of Pfizer–BioNTech COVID-19 vaccine donated by Foxconn, TSMC, and Tzu-chi Foundation.

The donation of Moderna COVID-19 vaccine makes Czech Republic the fourth country to donate COVID-19 vaccines to Taiwan after Japan, United States, and Lithuania. The 930,000 doses of the Pfizer–BioNTech COVID-19 vaccine was the first batch of Pfizer-BioNTech vaccine that Taiwan received and were part of the 15 million doses of Pfizer-BioNTech COVID-19 vaccine donation made by Foxconn, TSMC, and Tzu-chi Foundation. The late August early September vaccine delivery was seen as a crucial moment for Taiwan's COVID-19 vaccination plan as vaccination for the Oxford-AstraZeneca COVID-19 vaccine were now able to be extended all the way up to those ages above 23. The arrival of Pfizer-BioNTech COVID-19 vaccine also allows the CECC to kick start the vaccination for those from age 12 to 22.

September 
On 3 September, Japan announced that it has finalize plans to donate another batch of Oxford-AstraZeneca COVID-19 vaccine to Taiwan. The 64,000 doses of Oxford-AstraZeneca COVID-19 vaccine were delivered on 7 September. Combined with the previous donations, Japan has donated 4 batches and over 3.4 million doses of Oxford-AstraZeneca COVID-19 vaccine to Taiwan since June.

On 4 September, Poland announced that it will donate 400,000 doses of Oxford–AstraZeneca COVID-19 vaccine to Taiwan as a sign of friendship for Taiwan's donation of medical supplies to Poland in 2020. The donation makes Poland the 6th country after Japan, United States, Lithuania, Czech Republic, and Slovakia to announce donation of COVID-19 vaccine to Taiwan. The Polish donation was also the third largest in quantity behind Japan and United States.

On 5 September, Taiwan received two batches of the Oxford–AstraZeneca COVID-19 vaccine The first batch includes 400,000 doses of vaccine donated by the Polish government and the second batch includes 410,400 doses that were part of the vaccine purchase deal with COVAX.

On 9 September, the second batch of the Pfizer–BioNTech COVID-19 vaccine, with 910,000 doses, arrived in Taiwan. Combined with the first batch, the 1.8 million dose of Pfizer-BioNTech COVID-19 vaccine will be used for the youth vaccination program, ranging from age 12 to 22.

On 10 September, Taiwan received 458,000 doses of the AstraZeneca COVID-19 vaccine from the pharmaceutical manufacturer, which is part of the 10 million dose deal the Taiwanese government signed with AstraZeneca.

On 17 September, Taiwan received another 640,000 doses of the AstraZeneca vaccine from the pharmaceutical manufacturer, as well as 1,080,000 doses of the Moderna COVID-19 vaccine.

On 22 September, Taiwan began the roll-out of the Pfizer-BioNTech COVID-19 vaccine. The Pfizer-BioNTech COVID-19 vaccination plan will be started off with the age group 12 to 22 and those with ages above 60 or 40 in Group 9.

On 25 September, Taiwan received a further 500,000 doses of the AstraZeneca vaccine donated by the Japanese government. Combined with the previous donations, Japan has donated a total of 3.9 million doses to Taiwan through 5 batches from June to September.

On 26 September, Taiwan received 160,000 doses of Oxford-AstraZeneca vaccine donated by the Slovakian government. Slovakia, following Lithuania, Czech Republic, and Poland, became the fourth European country to donate COVID-19 vaccines to Taiwan. The CECC announced later that same day that the Oxford-AstraZeneca COVID-19 vaccine donated by Slovakia combined with other recent arrivals will all be used for second dose administration.

On 30 September, the third batch of Pfizer-BioNTech COVID-19 vaccine, with 540,000 doses, arrived in Taiwan, marking the start of the second delivery with 2 more batches arriving on October 1 and 4. On the same day, Taiwan received another 656,000 doses of the Oxford-AstraZeneca COVID-19 vaccine directly from the pharmaceutical manufacturer. As of 30 September 2021, Taiwan has received an accumulative total of 10 million dose of the Oxford-AstraZeneca COVID-19 vaccine with more than 50% of the 10 million dose vaccine deal with AstraZeneca being delivered.

October 
In October, Taiwan received a series of Pfizer-BioNTech COVID-19 vaccine deliveries. The early October deliveries allowed the CECC to expand vaccination capacity among different age groups, with age group 12–22, 9th group ages above 18, and age group 47 or above becoming eligible for receiving the first dose of Pfizer-BioNTech COVID-19 vaccine.

On 1 October, the fourth batch of the Pfizer–BioNTech COVID-19 vaccine with 670,000 doses, arrived in Taiwan.

On 4 October, the fifth batch of Pfizer–BioNTech COVID-19 vaccine with 270,000 doses, arrived in Taiwan.

On 6 October, Terry Gou, founder of Foxconn, announced that the third delivery Pfizer-BioNTech COVID-19 vaccine, with 1.6 to 1.8 million doses, will be delivered in the following week. The delivery has been split up into multiple batches and deliveries were received starting on October 7.

In the following weeks, Taiwan received multiple batches of the Pfizer–BioNTech COVID-19 vaccine. On 7 October, the sixth batch of Pfizer–BioNTech COVID-19 vaccine, with 889,200 doses, arrived in Taiwan. On 8 October, the seventh batch of Pfizer–BioNTech COVID-19 vaccine, with 889,200 doses, arrived in Taiwan. On 14 October, the eighth batch of Pfizer–BioNTech COVID-19 vaccine, with 827,000 doses, arrived in Taiwan. On 28 October, the ninth batch of Pfizer–BioNTech COVID-19 vaccine, with 902,100 doses, arrived in Taiwan. On 29 October, the tenth batch of the Pfizer–BioNTech COVID-19 vaccine, with 910,300 doses, arrived in Taiwan.

On 9 October, the eighth batch of the Moderna COVID-19 vaccine, with 1.13 million doses, and donation of 235,900 doses of the Oxford–AstraZeneca COVID-19 vaccine by the Lithuanian government arrived in Taiwan. The CECC later announced on the same day that the 1.13 million dose of Moderna COVID-19 vaccine will be primarily given to those who receive their first dose before 16 of July.

On 13 October, Taiwan received 1,360,000 doses of Oxford–AstraZeneca COVID-19 vaccine from the pharmaceutical manufacturer. On 27 October, Taiwan received a further 300,000 doses of Oxford–AstraZeneca COVID-19 vaccine.

November 
On 1 November, Taiwan received its second donation of Moderna COVID-19 vaccine from the United States with 1.5 million doses. On 5 November, Taiwan received its eleventh shipment of Pfizer–BioNTech vaccine with 871,700 doses.

On 10 November, Taiwan halts 2nd-dose of Pfizer–BioNTech COVID-19 vaccine for ages 12–17 due to concerns of myocarditis.

On 25 November, the percentage of Taiwanese citizens who are fully vaccinated against COVID-19 has reached 50%, nearing the Taiwan Centers for Disease Control's goal of 60% at the end of the year and the potential criteria for loosening border restrictions.

On 30 November, in order to prevent the spread of the latest COVID-19 Omicron variant, the Taiwan Centers for Disease Control announced COVID-19 booster shot policy details. Everyone above the age of 18 is encouraged to get a COVID-19 booster shot six months after receiving their second dose, with no restriction on vaccine brands.

Progress to date

Vaccine orders and arrival

Vaccine types

Vaccines orders and donations 

The Taiwanese government has ordered COVID-19 vaccines directly from the Oxford-AstraZeneca, Moderna, Medigen Vaccine Biologics Corp., and

United Biomedical. The Taiwanese government has also ordered another 4.76 million dose of vaccine through the COVAX platform besides the direct orders from pharmaceutical companies. An additional 15 million doses of Pfizer-BioNTech COVID-19 vaccine purchased by Foxconn, Taiwan Semiconductor Foundry Company, and Tzu-Chi Foundation were also been donated to the Taiwanese government for Taiwan's COVID-19 vaccination plan.

Foreign Vaccine Arrival

Domestic vaccine

Vaccination

Vaccination plan 
The Taiwanese government has created a prioritization list for domestic COVID-19 vaccination plan, which includes 10 prioritized groups.

Vaccination Appointment Platform 
On 6 July, the Central Epidemic Command Center (CECC) announced the creation of Taiwan Domestic COVID-19 Vaccination Appointment Platform, allowing the digitalization of COVID-19 vaccination sign up and appointments. The platform was created to simplify vaccination appointments and increase vaccine roll-outs.

The platform is a four-step system. In the first step, individuals would need to sign up on the website and fill in the necessary information, such as their National Identification Card number, National Health Insurance number, phone number, and their regional address. In first step, individuals are also allowed to choose their preferences, which includes the choice of receiving the Oxford-AstraZeneca COVID-19 Vaccine or the Moderna COVID-19 vaccine. In the second step, the system would send a message to individuals through their phone number and notify them to make an appointment. Individuals would only receive the message if they are eligible for vaccination and their preferred type of vaccine is in stock. In the third step, individuals can make their appointment on the platform, the vaccination app, or at the convenient store, pharmacy, or dedicated health centers. The appointment gives the option for individuals to select their preferred time and location. Lastly, in the fourth step, individuals would be required show up on-time for their appointment to be vaccinated. Individuals who missed their appointment would need to start the appointment process again.

On 8 July 2021, the CECC announced the opening of Taiwan Domestic COVID-19 Vaccination Appointment Platform across Taiwan, allowing the 9th and 10th priority group to sign up and fill in their vaccination preferences.

As of 15 July 2021, vaccination eligibility is open to the 9th and 10th priority groups and sign ups are open up to anyone born in or before 2003.

On 11 August 2021, Taiwan's CECC announced that appointment for the local made Medigen COVID-19 vaccine would be open for individuals of age 20 or above starting on August 16. Vaccination of the Medigen COVID-19 vaccine was announced to be held between August 23 to 29th.

On 27 August 2021, Taiwan's CECC announced that preference for the Pfizer-BioNTech COVID-19 vaccine would be open for registration on the platform.

Vaccination statistics

Vaccination regional data

See also 
COVID-19 vaccination in mainland China
Deployment of COVID-19 vaccines
COVID-19 vaccine

References 

Taiwan
vaccination